NJ is the abbreviation for the U.S. state of New Jersey.

Nj or NJ may also stand for:

Places
Narva-Jõesuu, Estonia
Nanjing, Jiangsu, China

Science and technology
Nanojoule (nJ), an International System of Units (SI) unit of energy equal to 10−9 joules
Neighbor joining, a bioinformatic method for the construction of phylogenetic trees

Other uses
Nj (digraph), a Latin-script digraph
Nippon Jamboree
Nordjyske Jernbaner, a Danish railway
Napierville Junction Railway
NJ.com, a news website

See also 
Nje, a letter of the Cyrillic script